Hu Jiumei (1830–1856) was a Chinese rebel during the Taiping Rebellion. A leading follower of Hong Xiuquan, she was known as one of the "Three Hu's".

References 
 Lily Xiao Hong Lee, Clara Lau, A.D. Stefanowska: Biographical Dictionary of Chinese Women: v. 1: The Qing Period, 1644–1911
 Jonathan D. Spence: God's Chinese Son: The Taiping Heavenly Kingdom of Hong Xiuquan

1830 births
1856 deaths
Military leaders of the Taiping Rebellion
19th-century Chinese people
People of the Taiping Rebellion
Women in 19th-century warfare
19th-century Chinese women
Women in war in China